The 1983 Railway Cup Hurling Championship was the 57th staging of the Railway Cup since its establishment by the Gaelic Athletic Association in 1927. The cup began on 6 February 1983 and ended on 17 March 1983.

Connacht were the defending champions.

On 17 March 1983, Connacht won the cup after a 0-10 to 1-05 defeat of Leinster in the final at Breffni Park. This was their fourth Railway Cup title overall and their second title in succession.

Results

Semi-finals

Final

Scoring statistics

Top scorers overall

Bibliography

 Donegan, Des, The Complete Handbook of Gaelic Games (DBA Publications Limited, 2005).

References

Railway Cup Hurling Championship
Railway Cup Hurling Championship
Hurling